Events from the year 2007 in Burkina Faso.

Incumbents
President: Blaise Compaoré
Prime Minister: Paramanga Ernest Yonli (until 11 June), Tertius Zongo (from 11 June)

Events

March 
6 March – Japan signs an agreement with Burkina Faso to aid the country with $3.4 million to combat food insecurity within the country.
 21 March – Government begins a vaccination campaign in the capital against Meningitis.

May 
 6 May – Burkinabe parliamentary election, 2007

October 
 16 October – Libya, Vietnam, Burkina Faso, Croatia and Costa Rica are elected to the United Nations Security Council as non-permanent members.
 22 October – The EDCTP conference is held in Ouagadougou to discuss and focus on clinical trials throughout the African continent.

Deaths

References

 
Years of the 21st century in Burkina Faso
2000s in Burkina Faso
Burkina Faso
Burkina Faso